Susannah Hersey Fiennes (born 27 February 1961) is a British artist who has worked extensively with Charles III and is collected in Europe, Asia and America.

Biography
Fiennes is the daughter of Lord and Lady Saye and Sele, who are the owners of Broughton Castle. Her twin brother is the heir to their father's barony. She is also the cousin of actor Ralph Fiennes. She was educated at Marlborough College and then at the Slade School of Art where she graduated with First Class Honours in 1983.

From 1985 to 1987, she taught art and history of art at Dulwich College, London. Subsequently, she ran a private art class in Westminster, London, from 1987 to 1993. In 1994, she had a painting class at the National Portrait Gallery, London.

In 1995, she came to national attention when she was recommended by a friend to  King Charles, who was at the time Prince of Wales. She became the tour artist with the King in Oman. In 1997 she was again chosen to tour with the King, on this occasion to Hong Kong to record the handing over of the territory to China. The King funded the tour and, in return, chose which paintings he wished to keep. She toured with him to Argentina, Uruguay and the Falkland Islands in 1999.

Between 1999 and 2004, she had a studio and home in New York. She currently has studios in Wales and Ireland and teaches at the Royal Drawing School in London.

She has written a series of articles on this for Prospect and the Daily Telegraph. She has also featured in the Daily Telegraph and the Tatler.

Exhibitions

Solo exhibitions
 Thomas Williams Fine Art Gallery, London:  Making Music 2005
 Somoza-Sims Gallery, Houston, Texas 2000
 Grosvenor Gallery, London 1999
 Raphael Valls Gallery, London 1998
 National Portrait Gallery, London: Chinese Characters 1998
 Cadogan Contemporary Gallery, London 1992 and 1994

Group exhibitions
Group exhibitions include:
 The Forbes Gallery, 5th Ave, New York City 2000
 Hampton Court Palace, London. Travels with the Prince. 1998
 National Museum of Wales, Cardiff. Princes as Patrons. 1998
 Cadogan Contemporary, London 1990 and 1997
 The National Portrait Gallery, London. BP Portrait Exhibition 1989, 1991 and 1993

Awards
 BP Travel Award (China) 1993
 British Institution Fund Award, Royal Academy (London) 1984
 Boise Travel Scholarship (Italy) 1983

Collections
Her paintings are in several collections including:
 His Royal Highness The Prince of Wales
 The House of Commons, Westminster, London 
 Hambros Bank, London, New York, Hong Kong
 The National Portrait Gallery, London
 Royal College of Psychiatrists, London.
 Barings Bank, London

Notes and references

External links
 Artist's official website

1961 births
People educated at Downe House School
Living people
20th-century British painters
21st-century British painters
Susannah
Daughters of barons
People educated at Marlborough College
Date of birth missing (living people)
British landscape painters
British portrait painters
British twins